Núi Thành is a district (huyện) of Quảng Nam province in the South Central Coast region of Vietnam. As of 2003 the district had a population of 142,020. The district covers an area of 533 km2. The district capital lies at Núi Thành.

Núi Thành district has the biggest gas warehouse of central Vietnam, Total Gas & Power Co. Ltd's Kỳ Hà gas warehouse, near Kỳ Hà Fishing Port (it was previously a military air base, see also List of United States Marine Corps installations#Vietnam). A THACO-Kia automobile plant is also located in the district.

Núi Thành is also the home of Chu Lai Airport which was renovated from the abandoned Chu Lai Air Base from the Vietnam War. As of 2015, the airport provides direct daily flights to Hanoi and Ho Chi Minh City.

History

The district was founded on December 3, 1983, when Tam Kỳ district was partitioned into Núi Thành District and the provincial city Tam Kỳ of Quảng Nam – Đà Nẵng Province. Since November 26, 1996, the district has been part of Quảng Nam province with Núi Thành as the district center.

Administrative divisions

Núi Thành district is divided into 1 town, Núi Thành (also the district capital), and 16 communes: Tam Anh Bắc, Tam Anh Nam, Tam Giang, Tam Hải, Tam Hiệp, Tam Hòa, Tam Mỹ Đông, Tam Mỹ Tây, Tam Nghĩa, Tam Quang, Tam Sơn, Tam Thạnh, Tam Tiến, Tam Trà, Tam Xuân 1 and Tam Xuân 2.

Source: Quang Nam Home Department, 2008

References

Districts of Quảng Nam province